Shamsul Morakheen' Allama Hakeem Sayyid Shamsullah Qadri (24 November 1885 – 22 October 1953) born in Hyderabad Deccan and was an author, writer, editor-in-chief, Honorary Member of 'Societe de I' Histoire de I'Inde Francaise and member of Royal Asiatic Society of Great Britain and Ireland since 1913. Some of his works are editor journal of Tarikh and author of Urdu E Qadim in 1925. Allama Sayyid Shamsullah Qadri is considered as the First Researcher of Deccaniyat.

His book of history of Urdu literature ‘Urdu-e-Qadeem’ is considered to be a basic writing on this subject.  Qadri wrote more than hundred essays on historical, biographical and literary topics. Beside these essays he wrote several books relating to different aspects of the history of the Muslim india. hibban 7A 0957 abs maldives

He also wrote on the Urdu relation of the Arabs with other nations of the world, before the dawn of Islam. This research article of Qadri is also considered to be the first writing in Urdu on this subject 'ISLAM'. He has the honor to be the First scholar of Urdu who wrote an encyclopedia in this language.,'Qadri was an Expert and Foremost Scholar, he had command over many different languages, apart from  Arabic, Persian, Urdu, Hindi he also had proficiency over English, French, Russian, German and others.
From Qadri's Finest Encyclopaedia  covering extensive and comprehensive bibliographies of important sources from Ancient times includes wider range of information, brings into light very rare and useful information about the ancient trade systems of Persian and Chinese. where he describe in detail

" From time immemorial commercial relations existed  " between Persia and China.

There were two routes :

1. the " sea route passed from the Persian Gulf, Malabar, Ceylon British Ceylon, " Java and Sumatra to Southern China South China ;
2. and the three " land routes were :
2.1. Through Kashmir
2.2. Through Katha Katha, Burma and Kathan  
2.3. Through Mongolia.

The land route was much more frequented than the sea route. The Caravans from Persia followed the route " through Katha and Kathan" in preference to any other. 
There is a Persian work called Khatai Namah, some " portions of which have been translated by Mr. Schoefer, " which has an account of a Persian merchant. 
This book " gives a detailed description of the trade routes of China and " the various commodities traded in. 
The Persians used to 'take precious stones, coral, goor (molasses), pearls, and " cotton goods to China and got in return Silk, Brocade, china ware, tea, and various kinds of drugs.

Biography
Sayyid Shamsullah Qadri was born in Lal Bagh, Hyderabad State on 5 November 1885 to Sayyid Zulfekharullah Shah Qadri and his wife Sayyida Mahboob Begum, he had one daughter and four sons namely Sayyida Shahinsha Begum, Padmashri Sayyid Ahmedullah Qadri, Sayyid Imdadullah Qadri, Sayyid Saadullah Qadri and Sayyid Asadullah Qadri.

Allama Sayyid Shamsullah Qadri had also written many books and was the First Researcher of Deccaniyat.

Works
  Tarikh i zaban i Urdu : ya'ni, Urdu'e qadim :  A very rare and detailed history from the birth of the Urdu language down to the death of Emperor Aurangzeb showing the details of its development, Urdu-E-Qadeem is considered to have Very useful information about the Language Urdu and gives the detail light from its Dawn to its Progress .the book is part of many contemporary Universities all across the globe including INDIA, PAKISTAN, U.K, U.S.A, CANADA and others, this particular book of Urdu literature was Part of Main Course syllabus in Masters of Arts (M.A) considering Urdu language as Major   it was published in 1925 by famous publisher Matba Munshi Newal Kishore from Lucknow INDIA.
 Genealogical account of Nawab Nizam ul-Mulk Asaf Jah's family Shajarah-i Asafiyah : Written in Persian With Forewords in English and Urdu Language Published by Tarikh Office in year 1938. A detailed genealogical account of Nawab Nizam ul-Mulk Asaf Jah's family Nizam of Hyderabad, Compiled by Nawab Muazzam-uddawlah Muhammad Badaruddin Khan Bahadur Rafat Jung in 1301 A.H, the fourth son of Amir-i-kabir Shams-ul-Umara Nawab Muhammad Fakharuddin Khan Bahadur in 1252 A.H and supplemented by Mir Jahandar Ali Khan  with a Foreword by Nawab Jivan Yar Jang President Lutfuddaulah Oriental Research Institute , B.A(cantab) Bar-at-law, Chief justice High Court of Hyderabad . Edited by Allama Hakim Sayyid Shamsullah Qadri  Honorary Member,'Societe de I' Histoire de I'Inde Francaise. with an introductory note, detail historical references and genealogical tables. The book not only provides the Comprehensive Genealogy of Asaf Jahi Dynasty, it also describes the Various branches that have Sprung from the Dynasty ,.
 Mooheem Arcot, Siege of Arcot''' : Published in 1940 in Tarikh Journal By Hakeem Sayyid Shamsullah Qadri in 1940, in which he has described in very detail, about the "Arcot battle" which took place in south East India in 1751 Era. between British East India. East India Company supporting Mohammed Ali, Nawab of Tanjore. Thanjavur Vs French East India Company supporting Nawab of Arcot, Chanda Sahib.
	Shahnama Dibacha Qadim, 
	Masqukat Qadim, 
	Tariq E Adab, 
	Tariq Mashahir Hind, 
	Tazkeratul Shorra O Shaairat, 
	Assar Ul Ikraam, 
	Jawahirul Ajaib, 
	Mehboob Ul Assar, 
	Khamusul Illam, 
	Asnamul Arab, 
	Qabul Islam, 
	Salateen e Muabber 1929, 
	Tareekh E Maleebaar,
	Mowarrikheen E Hind,
	Tahfat al Mujahidin 1931,
	Imadiya,
	Nizam Ut Tawareekh,
	Tareekh Zuban Urdu-Urdu-E-Qadeem,
	Tareekh Zuban Urdu Al Musamma Ba Urdu-E-Qadeem,
	Tarikh Vol III,
	Tarikh,
	Ahleyaar,
	Pracina malabar,
	Sikkajaat Shahan Awadh (1918).

See also
 List of Indian writers

References

1885 births
1953 deaths
Urdu-language poets from India
20th-century Indian writers
Writers from Andhra Pradesh
20th-century Indian male writers
Qadiri order